Journaux is a 4 track EP released by Melbourne band The Getaway Plan on 1 September 2014.

The EP was self-produced by the band and made available as an exclusive download as a part of their PledgeMusic campaign for their new album Dark Horses.

It contains three old songs in a stripped back format and one previously unreleased B-side.

Track listing

References

2014 EPs
The Getaway Plan albums